Cnemidophorus splendidus, the blue rainbow lizard, is a species of teiid lizard found in Venezuela.

References

splendidus
Reptiles of Venezuela
Endemic fauna of Venezuela
Reptiles described in 1997
Taxa named by Allan L. Markezich
Taxa named by Charles J. Cole
Taxa named by Herbert C. Dessauer